Alexander Andrew Mackay Irvine, Baron Irvine of Lairg,  (born 23 June 1940), known as Derry Irvine, is a Scottish lawyer, judge and politician who served as Lord Chancellor from 1997 to 2003.

He founded and headed 11 King's Bench Walk Chambers in the 1980s, and later became a Recorder and Deputy High Court Judge. A member of the Labour Party, Irvine was appointed to the House of Lords in 1987 and served as Shadow Lord Chancellor from 1992 to 1997. He was appointed to the position in Cabinet by Prime Minister Tony Blair, his former pupil, after the 1997 election and served until his dismissal in 2003.

Early life and education
Alexander Andrew Mackay Irvine was born on 23 June 1940 in Inverness, Scotland to a roofer and a waitress. He was educated at the independent Hutchesons' Boys' Grammar School in Glasgow.

Irvine read Scots law at the University of Glasgow, where he became involved in debating through the Glasgow University Dialectic Society and Glasgow University Union; He befriended Donald Dewar and John Smith through his involvement in the societies. Irvine subsequently read English law at Christ's College, Cambridge.

Legal career
After teaching law at the London School of Economics, Irvine was called to the Bar in 1967 and joined chambers headed by Morris Finer. He was appointed a Queen's Counsel in 1978 and founded 11 King's Bench Walk Chambers in 1981, becoming head of chambers. Irvine's pupil barristers included Tony Blair and Cherie Booth. In the 1980s, he became a Recorder and later a Deputy High Court Judge.

Political career 
At the 1970 general election, Irvine unsuccessfully contested Hendon North as the Labour Party candidate. A legal adviser to the Party through the 1980s, he was awarded a life peerage as Baron Irvine of Lairg, of Lairg in the District of Sutherland, on 25 March 1987.

Irvine served as Shadow Lord Chancellor from 1992 to 1997 under Labour leaders John Smith, Margaret Beckett, and Tony Blair. After Labour's election victory in 1997, Blair appointed him as Lord Chancellor.

During Irvine's tenure as Lord Chancellor, he oversaw the incorporation of the European Convention on Human Rights into UK law. In 2001, Irvine gained further responsibility for constitutional issues including human rights and freedom of information. He notably chose not to wear the officeholder's traditional attire during most of his tenure in the role.

Blair dismissed Irvine from the Cabinet in June 2003, when he announced his intention to abolish the position of Lord Chancellor. However, the role was not abolished, but was used as a secondary title for the Justice Secretary from 2005.

Controversies 
Irvine was criticised for spending £650,000 of public money to redecorate the Lord Chancellor's residence in 1998. The cost included £59,000 in hand-printed wallpaper, and contractors had to sign the Official Secrets Act to prevent expenditure leaks. Although renovation responsibility was with the Lords authorities, Irvine defended the cost by stating that the materials would last longer than cheaper products.

He was awarded a pay rise of £22,691 in 2003, as a result of a formula designed to keep his salary ahead that of the Lord Chief Justice. However, he accepted a lower increase following public backlash to the decision.

Personal life
Irvine was married to Alison McNair, with whom he had a son, Alistair, and later divorced. He began his relationship with McNair during her marriage to Donald Dewar. Alistair was sentenced to 16 months in jail in the US, after pleading guilty to stalking and vandalism in 2002.

Arms

References

|-

1940 births
Academics of the London School of Economics
Alumni of Christ's College, Cambridge
Alumni of the University of Glasgow
British King's Counsel
Labour Party (UK) life peers
Living people
Lord chancellors of Great Britain
Members of the Privy Council of the United Kingdom
People educated at Hutchesons' Grammar School
People from Inverness
Scottish lawyers
Scottish politicians
Honorary Fellows of the London School of Economics
Life peers created by Elizabeth II